Šormaz is a Serbian and Bosnian language surname.  People with the name include:
Dragan Šormaz (born 1967), Serbian politician
Stefan Šormaz (born 1999), Serbian footballer

References

Serbian surnames
Bosnian surnames